This was the first edition of the tournament.

Juan Ignacio Londero won the title after defeating Roberto Quiroz 6–1, 6–3 in the final.

Seeds

Draw

Finals

Top half

Bottom half

References
Main Draw
Qualifying Draw

CDMX Open - Singles